The Jöriseen are a group of Alpine lakes located west of the Jörifless Pass and north of the Flüela Wisshorn, in the Swiss canton of Graubünden. The largest lake has an area of 0.095 km² and is located at 2,489 metres above sea level. They are located in the municipality of Klosters.

See also
List of mountain lakes of Switzerland

External links

References

Lakes of Graubünden
Lakes of Switzerland
Klosters-Serneus